Westelijke Eilanden (Western Islands) are three islands in the Centrum district of Amsterdam: Bickerseiland, Prinseneiland and Realeneiland.
They are located to the south of the IJ and the Zeeheldenbuurt, to the north of the railway line between Central Station and Amsterdam-Sloterdijk, to the west of the Westerdok and to the east of the Planciusbuurt on the Westerkanaal. 
The Westelijke Eilanden form the core of the Golden Reael area, which also includes the adjacent Westerdok island, the Haarlemmerbuurt and the Planciusbuurt.

The Westelijke Eilanden form a small world apart from the city.
They are suitable for walks, which Joannes Antonides van der Goes recommended in a poem, Ystroom, as early as 1671.
They are often used for filming. 
There have always been warehouses and shipyards on the Westelijke Eilanden. 
They formed an important part of the atmosphere on the islands, a combination of working and living. 
The islands are sometimes called the "Mokum Archipelago".

History

The Nieuwe Waal was deepened in the IJ in 1610 and demarcated with rows of poles as an extension of the Port of Amsterdam.
This left an area of almost floating or loose peat in the corner of the IJ, which needed to be stabilized.
Between 1611 and 1615 three large artificial islands were created there, protected by a large bulwark that extended as far as the IJ. 
This was part of the Third Expansion - Derde Uitleg (nl) - of Amsterdam, for which the first plans date from 1610.
Land speculation by a number of council members, including Frans Hendricksz. Oetgens, led to a riot in the council in 1614. 
If the speculators had got their way it would have led to the need for extensive buy-out of land by the city, or a reduction in income to the city.

Names of the islands 

Initially, the three largest islands were called Vooreiland, Middeneiland and Achtereiland. 
They were connected by eight bridges. 
The Vooreiland was renamed Bickerseiland after Jan Bicker, a descendant of the Bicker merchant family who had managed the construction in the city administration. 
Achtereiland was for the same reason named Realeneiland after Jacob Reael. 
Middeneiland was named Prinseneiland after the first three Princes of Orange.

In contrast to the Eastern Islands, shipyards and warehouses on the Westelijke Eilanden were not involved with the Dutch East India Company or the Admiralty of Amsterdam, but with the Dutch West India Company and the trade in the Levant and the Baltic Sea. 
One shipyard built pleasure boats. 
The warehouses stored herring, grain, tobacco, wine, salt, anchovies, cat skins, pitch and tar. 
The Silodam, Zoutkeetsgracht, Bokkinghangen, Nieuwe Teertuinen and Breeuwerstraten owe their names to the activities of grain storage, salt refining, fish smoking, tarring and calking.

Port falls into decay

Until the end of the 19th century this was an area with many shipyards, small industries and warehouses. 
On the islands and in the immediate vicinity there were also salt sheds, buckling smokehouses, and tar and tanning works where ship timbers, sails and fishing nets were preserved. 
Then the ships became too large for this port, and the development of the Eastern Docklands took over the role the Westelijke Eilanden had played for more than 200 years. 
During the first half of the 20th century, the neighborhood fell into decay. 
Nevertheless, much has been preserved of the atmosphere of the busy past.

Bickerseiland 

Bickerseiland, originally the Vooreiland, was named after the Bicker patrician and merchant family who owned land there. There were a dozen shipyards on Bickerseiland. 
A marina was built at an early stage. 
There was a three-aisled wooden church from 1660, which was replaced by a stone building around 1736. 
After this Island Church was closed in 1939 and demolished in 1950, the churches were used for the restoration of the floor of St. Martin's Church, Bolsward. 
Some of the household items ended up in a restaurant on the Haarlemmerstraat.

Bickerseiland is no longer an island due to the construction of the railway embankment between Westerdok and Westerpoort (1878) for the Den Helder–Amsterdam railway.

Prinseneiland

This island, at first called the Middeneiland, was named after the (first three) Princes of Orange Princes Island.

After a city council conflict that lasted ten years, the sale of building plots on Princes' Island began in 1623. The island was intended for wood storage and tar. Of the 900 warehouses in Amsterdam, more than one hundred were on Prinseneiland. 
An attempt in 1662 to call the Galgenstraat the Prinsendwarsstraat never got off the ground. Neeltje Pater from Broek in Waterland inherited at least eleven warehouses on the island.

Hardly anyone lived on Prinseneiland until after World War II. The island was rediscovered by the artists Jan Sierhuis, Johan van der Keuken, Jef Diederen, Reinier Lucassen, Peter Schat and Willem Breuker. 
Since then, the island has turned into an attractive residential and working area. Most of the warehouses have been divided into apartments. The neighborhood still attracts many people with an artistic background: actors, musicians, furniture makers, program makers and artists, such as Benno Premsela, Ans Marcus, Willem Nijholt, Tijmen Ploeg, Raoul Hynckes, Han Wezelaar, Auke Hettema and Martijn Padding.

There are 38 national monuments on the island.

Realeneiland 

The Realeneiland, at first called Achtereiland, was named after the Reael family, who owned land there.

In 1617 cheap land on the Achtereiland started to be provided to herring fishermen from outside the city. A herring bakery was built in 1648 by the Reael family on the Zandhoek, the side that bordered on the IJ (now shielded by Westerdok and  Westerdoksdijk).
The gable stone depicted a Golden Reaal, a Spanish/Portuguese coin that was used all over the world at the beginning of the 17th century.
It showed one holding an image of Emperor Charles V.
It made such an impression in the 20th century that the neighborhood was called the Golden Reaal.

Reael gave credit to ship carpenters, who did not have to pay rent for the first twelve years, but had to deliver a ship. 
He also had houses built on the island, which the city opposed.
The Tar Company of Joseph Deutz got a large yard on the Realen Island in 1664.
Until 1673 there was also a peat market. 
Sand was stored on the Zandhoek, which was used as ballast and for raising streets and neighborhoods in the center. 
As early as 1676 there was a brandy distillery at the Drieharingenbrug, called De drie gecroonde haringen (The three crowned herrings). 
These business premises were demolished around 1780 by shipbuilder Haring Booy and rebuilt as a sort of country house.
For many years, the tobacco firm British American Tobacco was established on Realeneiland. 
The island became known through the books of Jan Mens about the Golden Reael. 
There are still thirteen impressive captain's houses.

Miscellaneous

 Jacob Olie came from the Westelijke Eilanden and photographed the area extensively.
 George Hendrik Breitner (1857-1923) and Kees Maks (1876-1967) worked on Prinseneiland.
 The so-called Open Workshop Days take place around Pentecost on the Westelijke Eilanden.

Bridges 
The connections to and between the Westelijke Eilanden consist of drawbridges.

See also
Gouden Reael

References

Sources

External links

 Bickerseiland (Bickers Island) Video on YouTube
Prinseneiland (Prince Island) Video on YouTube
Realeneiland (Realen Island Video on YouTube
Gebruik de groene knoppen rechts om een virtuele wandeling te maken over de Westelijke eilanden
 Foto's van de buurt

Neighbourhoods of Amsterdam